The Belfast South by-election of 22 October 1963 was held after the death of Ulster Unionist Party Member of Parliament (MP) Sir David Campbell on 12 June the same year. The seat was retained by the Ulster Unionists.

Results

References

External links 
A Vision Of Britain Through Time 
British Parliamentary by-elections, 1963: Belfast South
Albert Hamilton's by-election literature
Result from previous election

1963 elections in the United Kingdom
South
20th century in Belfast
1963 elections in Northern Ireland